Toy Story is a side-scrolling platform game released by Disney Interactive Studios in 1995 for the Sega Genesis, Super Nintendo Entertainment System, Game Boy, and Microsoft Windows. It is based on the film of the same name, and follows its plot. The game was followed by a sequel based on the second film, called Toy Story 2: Buzz Lightyear to the Rescue.

Gameplay
Players control Woody through several stages that encompass the entire plot of the film. Several obstacles lie between the player and the goal of each level, including an assortment of enemies. Woody is equipped with a pullstring whip, which will temporarily tie up opponents, letting Woody pass by unharmed. It cannot, however, kill enemies (with the lone exception of Nightmare Buzz, the only boss in the game to be permanently defeated through the whip). This whip can also latch onto certain hooks, letting Woody swing above perilous terrain.

The game occasionally changes genres for a stage. Players control R.C. in two stages: one in which Woody knocks Buzz out a window, the other in which they both race back to the moving truck. Both play largely the same; the game takes an overhead view of the level, giving the players basic acceleration, braking and steering, and tasking players with reaching the end of the stage while not running out of batteries (which drain constantly, but can be replenished by bumping them out of Buzz in the former stage, and merely finding them on the ground in the latter). Another stage is played from a first-person perspective as Woody searches through a maze to find alien squeaky toys lost inside the claw machine and return them to the play area, where the rest of the alien toys reside, all within a time limit.

The Sega Genesis version has 18 levels, while the Super NES and Microsoft Windows versions have 17. The Game Boy version is the shortest version of the game with 10 levels. The Genesis and Windows versions have an additional racing level named "Day-toy-na", absent from the other versions, in which Woody rides R.C. from the moving van to Buzz. The Windows version lacks "Really Inside the Claw Machine", the first-person maze level.

Plot
The game closely follows the plot of Toy Story, with a few minor differences.

It is the day of Andy's birthday party, and his toys are riled up about the possible newcomers and their potential replacement. In an effort to calm their nerves, Sheriff Woody sends a troop of green army men, along with a baby monitor, to report. The mission goes over smoothly; however, they receive an abrupt warning that Andy is returning to his room, sending everyone in a frenzy to return to their positions. Once things have settled down and Andy has left the room, the toys find a lone newcomer: Buzz Lightyear. They, except Woody, are impressed with him and his features, and Hamm decides that Woody and Buzz should have a race to settle their argument. Buzz wins the race, but Woody, still unfazed, challenges Buzz to fly around the room with his eyes closed, which Buzz does. Although Woody convinces himself that he is still Andy's favorite toy, he begins having nightmares about Buzz.

Jealous of all the attention Buzz has been getting, and wanting to be brought by Andy to Pizza Planet, Woody attempts to use R.C. to knock Buzz behind a cupboard, but accidentally knocks him out of a window, drawing the other toys' ire at him. Woody manages to escape from the angered toys with the help of Rex, who dislikes confrontations.  Woody is chosen by Andy as the toy to go to Pizza Planet, but during a stop at the gas station, Buzz hops in the van and attacks Woody. Buzz is defeated when Woody traps him in a spare tire. However, Andy and his mother leave, without noticing their absence. Woody and Buzz hitch a ride on a Pizza Planet van to return to Andy. Once there, the two toys disguise themselves as litter and sneak into Pizza Planet, avoiding contact with humans. Buzz sneaks into a claw machine, mistaking it for a rocket to return to his home planet; Woody sneaks in the coin slot and works through the hazardous innards in pursuit. Woody is greeted by the squeaky toy aliens inside, who task him with saving some of their own, lost even deeper inside the machine. Woody is successful with the task and the aliens thank him. However, Sid Phillips, Andy's toy destroying neighbor, notices Buzz in the claw machine and tries to fetch him out. Woody delays Buzz's capture by launching the Aliens at the claw, but is unable to prevent it, and instead goes along with him to Sid's house.

Woody and Buzz try to escape from Sid's room, which is overrun with metal bugs and live firecrackers. Sid occasionally pops in to torture Woody by setting his head on fire, sending Woody dashing for a nearby bowl of cereal to douse it. Woody and Buzz have a run-in with Sid's collection of mutilated toys, keeping them back with Buzz's karate-chop action. Sid decides to destroy Buzz with a large rocket, and takes him away. To save him, Woody then befriends the toys, and riding on the back of Roller Bob, sneaks out into Sid's backyard, dodging various pieces of litter and Sid's dog, Scud. The toys attack Sid and save Buzz, but Andy's family moves out of their house without either toy. Woody manages to catch up to the moving truck, but Buzz falls behind. Woody finds R.C., hops on his back on the road, and drives back for Buzz. Securing him, they proceed to ride R.C. back to the truck. However, R.C. is too slow to get there, so Buzz and Woody light the rocket on Buzz's back, cutting it off once they gain enough airspeed and glide all the way back to the van of Andy's mother. The two toys have gotten over their differences over the course of this adventure, and go on to be good friends in Andy's new house.

Development and release
The Game Boy version was developed by Tiertex Design Studios and the Windows version was developed by the same Disney Interactive in-house team that created Maui Mallard in Cold Shadow, while the other versions were developed by Traveller's Tales. The Sega Genesis version of Toy Story was the lead version. The game features 3D-rendered graphics, and Pixar provided Traveller's Tales with the film's animations of Woody and Scud. The development team and Pixar initially had issues rendering the animations with correct lighting that would allow the development team to convert them for the game. Pixar provided final animations to the team only two weeks before the game was to be submitted to Sega for final approval. If the game didn't receive approval the first time, its release would have been delayed, failing to coincide with the theatrical release of the film. As a precaution, Traveller's Tales rendered their own animations of Woody in case Pixar could not provide them on time.

Jon Burton, the founder of Traveller's Tales, served as both the designer and programmer for the game. To pass Sega's strict approval process, Burton disguised game glitches as part of the game; instead of receiving an error message, game testers would be sent to a bonus minigame, which Burton said was part of the game. While the film had vibrant, vivid colors, the Genesis had only a limited array of colors. As a partial solution, Traveller's Tales utilized a special mode that provided access to additional shades of red, green, and blue. The Windows game features instrumental versions of two Randy Newman songs from the film.

The game was published by Disney Interactive. In the United States, the Genesis version was released in November 1995, coinciding with the film's release. The Super NES version followed shortly thereafter. The Game Boy version was released in May 1996 and the Windows version was released on 31 October 1996. In Europe, the Genesis version was released around Easter 1996, while the Super NES version was released in June 1996.

In Taiwan, an unlicensed and pirated port was developed for the NES in 1997, which circulated in Europe and Russia. The port was made by Ei-How Yang, an ex-Sachen developer.

Reception

Eurogamer reported in 2018 of Toy Story garnering "millions of sales" upon release; according to Jon Burton, this changed other companies' business models to have games launch at the same time the film was released. According to Disney Interactive, the Super NES and Genesis versions were both "tremendous successes", though a Super NES chip shortage prevented them from producing as many copies of the Super NES version as they believed they could have sold.

Toy Story was received positively on the Genesis and SNES, while reception to the PC version was mixed. The game was praised for its impressive visuals, varied gameplay, and the PC version's enhanced soundtrack, but criticized for its poor controls and uneven difficulty, with some levels which reviewers found to be too frustratingly difficult, particularly for the young target audience. The visuals were best received on the Genesis version due to the game's 3D-rendered graphics, which had several precedents on the SNES and PC but were completely new to the Genesis. Critics were varied in their overall impressions; GamePro concluded that "despite the stunning graphics, Toy Story'''s uninspiring gameplay makes for merely fleeting fun", while Game Informer decreed the game "a humorous and fun adventure that will certainly entertain everyone in the whole family". Roger Burchill of Super Play wrote that while the Genesis version "marked a new high point" in graphics and gameplay, the Super NES version "can't help but be compared to Donkey Kong Country 2 and that's a comparison where it will lose every time".

Mark East of GameSpot praised the soundtrack of the Windows version but had several minor criticisms of the game, including keyboard control issues, delayed sound effects, and brief pauses that occur when the soundtrack restarts. Adam Douglas of PC Gamer considered it to be rushed, unoriginal, difficult, and frustrating, and concluded that the game failed to recapture "the magic of the film".

The Game Boy version received little coverage. A brief review in GamePro opined that it did not live up to the legacy of the film and previous versions of the game, citing "plodding and repetitive" gameplay, rudimentary graphics, and the inaccuracy of Woody's drawstring.Toy Story was nominated for the Video Software Dealers Association's "Video Game of the Year" for 1995, losing to Donkey Kong Country 2''. In 1996, GamesMaster ranked the Mega Drive version 3rd on their "The GamesMaster Mega Drive Top 10."

See also
List of Disney video games

Notes

References

External links

Toy Story can be played for free in the browser on the Internet Archive

1995 video games
Disney video games
Game Boy games
Platform games
Single-player video games
Sega Genesis games
Super Nintendo Entertainment System games
Tiertex Design Studios games
Toy Story video games
Traveller's Tales games
Video games based on films
Video games scored by Allister Brimble
Video games developed in the United States
Windows games
Psygnosis games
Video games scored by Andy Blythe and Marten Joustra
Video games developed in the United Kingdom
Black Pearl Software games